Eliza Rosanna Gilbert, Countess of Landsfeld (17 February 1821 – 17 January 1861), better known by the stage name Lola Montez, was an Irish dancer and actress who became famous as a Spanish dancer, courtesan, and mistress of King Ludwig I of Bavaria, who made her Gräfin von Landsfeld (Countess of Landsfeld). At the start of the Revolutions of 1848 in the German states, she was forced to flee. She proceeded to the United States via Austria, Switzerland, France and London, returning to her work as an entertainer and lecturer.

Biography

Early life

Eliza Rosanna Gilbert was born into an Anglo-Irish family, the daughter of Elizabeth ("Eliza") Oliver, who was the daughter of Charles Silver Oliver, a former High Sheriff of Cork and member of Parliament for Kilmallock in County Limerick, Ireland. Their residence was Castle Oliver. In December 1818, Eliza's parents, Ensign Edward Gilbert and Eliza Oliver, met when he arrived with the 25th Regiment. They were married on 29 April 1820, and Lola was born the following February, in the village of Grange in the north of County Sligo, refuting persistent rumours that her mother was pregnant with her at the time of the wedding. The young family made their residence at King House in Boyle, County Roscommon, until early 1823, when they journeyed to Liverpool, England, and later departed for India on 14 March.

Published reports differ regarding the actual date of Eliza's birth. For many years, it was accepted that she was born in the city of Limerick, as she herself claimed, possibly on 23 June 1818; this is the year that was graven on her headstone. However, when her baptismal certificate came to light in the late 1990s, it was established that Eliza Rosanna Gilbert was actually born in Grange, County Sligo, in Connacht, Ireland, on 17 February 1821. At the time of her birth, all of Ireland was part of the United Kingdom of Great Britain and Ireland. She was baptised at St. Peter's Church in Liverpool, England, on 16 February 1823, while her family was en route to her father's post in India.

Shortly after their arrival in India, Edward Gilbert died of cholera. Her mother, who was then 19, married Lieutenant Patrick Craigie the following year. Craigie quickly came to care for the young Eliza, but her spoiled and half-wild ways concerned him greatly. Eventually, it was agreed she would be sent back to Britain to attend school, staying with Craigie's father in Montrose, Scotland. But the "queer, wayward little Indian girl" rapidly became known as a mischief-maker. On one occasion, she stuck flowers into the wig of an elderly man during a church service; on another, she ran through the streets naked.

At the age of ten, Eliza was moved again—this time to Sunderland, England, where her stepfather's older sister, Catherine Rae, set up a boarding school in Monkwearmouth with her husband. Eliza continued her education there. Eliza's determination and temper were to become her trademarks. Her stay in Sunderland lasted only a year, as she was then transferred to a school in Camden Place (now Camden Crescent), Bath, for a more sophisticated education.

In 1837, sixteen-year-old Eliza eloped with Lieutenant Thomas James, and they married. The couple separated five years later, in Calcutta, India, and she became a professional dancer under a stage name.

When she had her London debut as "Lola Montez, the Spanish dancer" in June 1843, she was recognised as "Mrs. James". The resulting notoriety hampered her career in England, so she departed for the continent, where she had success in Paris and Warsaw. At this time, she was almost certainly accepting favours from a few wealthy men, and was regarded by many as a courtesan.

Life as a courtesan

In 1844, Eliza, now known as Lola Montez, made a personally disappointing Parisian stage debut as a dancer in Fromental Halévy's opera Le lazzarone. She met and had an affair with Franz Liszt, who introduced her to the circle of George Sand. After performing in various European capitals, she settled in Paris, where she was accepted into the city's literary Bohemia, becoming acquainted with Alexandre Dumas, with whom she was also rumoured to have had a dalliance. In Paris she would meet Alexandre Dujarier, "owner of the newspaper with the highest circulation in France, and also the newspaper's drama critic". Through their romance, Montez revitalised her career as a dancer. Later on, after the two had their first quarrel over Lola's attendance at a party, Dujarier attended the party and, in a drunken state, offended Jean-Baptiste Rosemond de Beauvallon. When Dujarier was challenged to a duel by de Beauvallon, Dujarier was shot and killed.

In 1846, she arrived in Munich, where she was discovered by and became the mistress of King Ludwig I of Bavaria. There was a rumour that when they first met, Ludwig asked her in public if her breasts were real. Her response to the question was to tear off enough of her garments to prove that they were. She soon began to use her influence on the king and this, coupled with her arrogant manner and outbursts of temper, made her extremely unpopular with the Bavarian people (particularly after documents were made public showing that she was hoping to become a naturalised Bavarian subject and be elevated to nobility). Despite opposition, Ludwig made her Countess of Landsfeld on his next birthday, 25 August 1847, and along with her title, he granted her a large annuity.

For more than a year, she exercised great political power, which she directed in favour of liberalism, anti-Catholicism, and in attacks against the Jesuits. Her ability to manipulate the king was so great that the Minister of State, Karl von Abel, was dismissed because he and his entire cabinet had objected to Lola being granted Bavarian nationality and the title of Countess. The students at Munich University were divided in their sympathies, and conflicts arose shortly before the outbreak of the revolutions of 1848, which led the king, at Lola's insistence, to close the university.

In March 1848, under pressure from a growing revolutionary movement, the university was re-opened, Ludwig abdicated in favor of his son, King Maximilian II, and Montez fled Bavaria. Her career as a power behind the throne was permanently at an end. It seems likely that Ludwig's relationship with Montez contributed greatly to his forced abdication despite his previous popularity.

After a sojourn in Switzerland, where she waited in vain for Ludwig to join her, Lola made one brief excursion to France and then removed to London in late 1848. There she met and quickly married George Trafford Heald, a young army cornet (cavalry officer) with a recent inheritance. But the terms of her divorce from Thomas James did not permit either spouse's remarriage while the other was living, and the beleaguered newly-weds were forced to flee the country to escape a bigamy action brought by Heald's scandalised maiden aunt. The Healds resided for a time in France and Spain, but within two years, the tempestuous relationship was in tatters, and George reportedly drowned in 1856. In 1851 she set off to make a new start in the United States, where she was surprisingly successful at first in rehabilitating her image.

American career

From 1851 to 1853, Lola performed as a dancer and actress in the eastern United States, one of her offerings being a play called Lola Montez in Bavaria. In May 1853, she arrived on the west coast in San Francisco where her performances created a sensation, but soon inspired a popular satire, Who's Got the Countess? She married Patrick Hull, a local newspaperman, in July and moved to Grass Valley, California, in August.

Lola remained in Grass Valley at her little house for nearly two years. The restored property went on to become California Historical Landmark No. 292. Lola served as an inspiration to another aspiring young entertainer, Lotta Crabtree, whose parents ran a boarding house in Grass Valley. Lola, a neighbour, provided dancing lessons and encouraged Lotta's enthusiasm for performance.

Australia tour
In June 1855, Lola departed the U.S. to tour Australia and resume her career by entertaining miners at the gold diggings during the gold rush of the 1850s. She arrived in Sydney on 16 August 1855.

Historian Michael Cannon claims that "in September 1855 she performed her erotic Spider Dance at the Theatre Royal in Melbourne, raising her skirts so high that the audience could see she wore no underclothing at all. Next day, The Argus thundered that her performance was 'utterly subversive to all ideas of public morality'. Respectable families ceased to attend the theatre, which began to show heavy losses."

She earned further notoriety in Ballarat when, after reading a bad review of her performance in The Ballarat Times, she attacked the editor, Henry Seekamp, with a whip. Although the "Lola Montes Polka" (composed by Albert Denning) is rumoured to have been inspired by this event, the song was published in 1855 and the incident with Seekamp occurred months later in February 1856. At Castlemaine in April 1856, she was "rapturously encored" after her Spider Dance in front of 400 diggers (including members of the Municipal Council who had adjourned their meeting early to attend the performance), but drew the wrath of the audience after insulting them following some mild heckling.

She departed for San Francisco on 22 May 1856. On the return voyage her manager was lost at sea after going overboard.

Later life in the U.S.
Lola failed in her attempts at a theatrical comeback in various American cities. She arranged in 1857 to deliver a series of moral lectures in Britain and America written by Rev. Charles Chauncey Burr. She spent her last days in rescue work among women. In November 1859, The Philadelphia Press reported that Lola Montez was:

living very quietly up town, and doesn't have much to do with the world's people. Some of her old friends, the Bohemians, now and then drop in to have a little chat with her, and though she talks beautifully of her present feelings and way of life, she generally, by way of parenthesis, takes out her little tobacco pouch and makes a cigarette or two for self and friend, and then falls back upon old times with decided gusto and effect. But she doesn't tell anybody what she's going to do.

Burial

By 1860, Lola was showing the tertiary effects of syphilis, and her body began to waste away. She died at the age of 39 on 17 January 1861. She is buried in Green-Wood Cemetery in Brooklyn, New York, where her tombstone states: "Mrs. Eliza Gilbert | Died 17 January 1861 | Æ. 42". ("Æ." abbreviates aetate, Latin for "at the age of".)

In popular culture

Lola Montez has been mentioned by several writers as a possible source of inspiration for the character Irene Adler in Arthur Conan Doyle's Sherlock Holmes story, "A Scandal in Bohemia". The character bears certain similarities to Montez, as a popular performer who influences national politics through her relationship with a powerful individual.
Lola's life was first portrayed in the 1919 biopic Lola Montez by Leopoldine Konstantin.
Lola's life was portrayed in the 1922 German film Lola Montez, the King's Dancer. Montez is played by Ellen Richter.
Montez's time in Bavaria was the subject of the novel A Drop of Spanish Blood (1932) by Serbian writer Miloš Crnjanski.
Montez was portrayed by Sheila Darcy in the film Wells Fargo (1937).
Montez was the last role played by Conchita Montenegro, in the film Lola Montes (1944), with a moralising script, directed by Antonio Román.
A character named Lola Montez is featured in the 1948 film Black Bart, played by Yvonne De Carlo.
Philip Van Doren Stern's novel Lola: A Love Story (Rinehart & Co., 1949) was based on her life.
Montez was portrayed by Carmen D'Antonio in the film Golden Girl (1951).
Montez was portrayed by Martine Carol in the film Lola Montès (1955), based on the novel La Vie Extraordinaire de Lola Montès by Cecil Saint-Laurent, directed by Max Ophüls and co-starring Peter Ustinov and Oskar Werner.
The actress Paula Morgan played Montez in the 1955 episode, "Lola Montez", of the syndicated television anthology series Death Valley Days, hosted by Stanley Andrews. Baynes Barron (1917–1982) was cast as Patrick Hull, a newspaperman who became Montez's third husband.
Montez's time in the Australian goldfields was the subject of the musical Lola Montez staged in Melbourne, Brisbane and Sydney in 1958 starring Mary Preston. The musical was liked by critics but did not become a commercial success. A recording of the musical was released on LP in 1958 in both mono and stereo versions.
Lola Montez is the title character in Season 3, Episode 23 of Tales of Wells Fargo, "Lola Montez," played by Rita Moreno, first broadcast in 1959.
Montez appears in Royal Flash by George MacDonald Fraser, where she has a brief affair with Sir Harry Flashman. She is also a character in the film of the same name (1975), in which she is played by Florinda Bolkan.
In one of J. B. Priestley's last fictional works, The Pavilion of Masks, she is unmistakably the original for Cleo Torres, Spanish dancer and mistress of a German prince.
Montez was allegedly the inspiration for Jennifer Wilde's historical romance novel Dare To Love (1978), whose protagonist Elena Lopez is also a British woman passing herself off as Spanish who becomes an exotic dancer. In the book, Elena has an affair with Franz Liszt, becomes friends with George Sand and has a friendship with the king of a small Germanic country obviously based on Ludwig I of Bavaria, then moves to California, all documented as having happened in Montez's life.
Montez is described in Daughter of Fortune (original Spanish title Hija de la fortuna) and Portrait in Sepia (original Spanish title "Retrato en Sepia") by the Chilean-American author Isabel Allende.
Trestle Theatre Company created a 2008 production titled Lola about the life of Lola Montez.
Musician Joanna Newsom's title track on the 2010 album Have One on Me is about Lola Montez.
Danish metal band Volbeat included a song on their 2013 album Outlaw Gentlemen & Shady Ladies about Montez. Entitled "Lola Montez", the lyrics reference Montez's spider dance and the incident with Henry Seekamp.
Lola Montez appears as a non-singing character in John Adams' opera Girls of the Golden West, performing the notorious Spider Dance for miners in a California gold rush mining camp. In the 2017 San Francisco premiere, the role was taken by Cuban dancer Lorena Feijóo.
Lola Montez has two lakes (an upper and lower) named after her in the Tahoe National Forest in Nevada County, California. 
There is also a mountain named in her honour, Mount Lola. At , it is the highest point in Nevada County, California.

Works

References

Further reading
 Browne, Nicholas, Castle Oliver & the Oliver Gascoignes
 Mackinlay, Leila, Spider dance: A novel based upon incidents in the life of Lola Montez
 Pastor, Urraca, Lola Montes. Mª Dolores Rosana Y Gilbert, Condesa De Landfeld, Barcelona 1946
 Saint-Laurent, Cecil, La Vie Extraordinaire de Lola Montès (basis for the 1955 movie Lola Montès)
 Seymour, Bruce, Lola Montez, a Life, Yale University Press, 1996
 Trowbridge, W. R. H. Lola Montez, 1818-1861 in Seven Splendid Sinners, p. 298

External links

Information about Castle Oliver, Lola Montez's ancestral home
RTE Hidden History Summary about Eliza Gilbert
Article from Australian Dictionary of Biography 
Bee Wilson: Boudoir Politics Review of Lola Montez: Her Life and Conquests by James Morton · Portrait, (2007) in London Review of Books Vol. 29 No. 11 dated 7 June 2007
Horace Wyndham, The Magnificent Montez: From Courtesan to Convert, New York: Hillman-Curl (1935). Project Gutenberg eBook.

 

1821 births
1861 deaths
19th-century Irish actresses
Burials at Green-Wood Cemetery
Deaths from syphilis
German countesses
Irish courtesans
Irish socialites
Irish emigrants to the United States (before 1923)
Irish female dancers
Irish stage actresses
Mistresses of German royalty
Actors from County Limerick
People from County Sligo
People from Grass Valley, California
People from the Kingdom of Bavaria
People of the California Gold Rush
People of the Revolutions of 1848